Simon Deutz (1802-1852) was a German-born French courtier.

Early life
Simon Deutz was born in 1802 in Koblenz, Germany. He emigrated to Paris with his family in 1806. His father, Emmanuel Deutz, served as the Chief Rabbi of France, from 1810 to 1842.

Career
Deutz was an advisor to Marie-Caroline de Bourbon-Sicile, duchesse de Berry. When, in 1832, she tried to regain her son's claim to the throne, after the July Revolution, Deutz denounced her to King Louis Philippe I.

Personal life
Deutz converted from Judaism to Roman Catholicism in 1828, and he received the Christian name Charles Gonzaga. However, as early as 1832, he made requests to the Consistory of France to be able to convert back to Judaism. Initially denied, he eventually converted back to Judaism after Adolphe Crémieux interceded in his favour. Meanwhile, he married in London, then moved to the United States, and finally moved back to France.

Death and legacy
Deutz died in 1852. Professor Catherine Nicault of the University of Reims Champagne-Ardenne has argued that Deutz's betrayal of Duchess Berry led to more antisemitism among the French aristocracy in the 19th century.

References

Further reading
Maurice Samuels, The Betrayal of the Duchess New York: Basic Books 2020 ISBN 9781541645455

1802 births
1852 deaths
People from Koblenz
German emigrants to France
French courtiers
Converts to Roman Catholicism from Judaism
19th-century French people